Real San Jose is an American soccer team based in San Jose, California, United States. Founded in 2007, the team competes in the National Soccer League (NSL).

The team plays its home games at PAL Stadium, where they relocated in 2016. The team's colors are red, white and black.

History
RSJ formed in 2007 as a member of the NPSL.

In 2013, the NPSL crafted an award in memory of Alexander Arellano. Alex, the middle son of Real San Jose owner Nick Arellano, died in 2012 at the age of 25. The award goes to the NPSL's top coach of the year. Since Real San Jose moved to the UPSL the award is now given to the "Best RSJ Teammate" of the year.

After ten years competing in the NPSL the club made the switch to the UPSL for 2017. In 2020, RSJ has moved to the National Soccer League.

Year-by-year

Head coaches
  Nicholas Arellano (2007–2016, 2019-2020)
  Dave Gold (2021–)

Stadia
 Yerba Buena High School; San Jose, California (2007–2013)
 Mount Pleasant High School; San Jose, California (2014–2015)
 PAL Stadium; San Jose, California (2016–present)

References

External links
Official website

United Premier Soccer League teams
National Premier Soccer League teams
Association football clubs established in 2007
Soccer clubs in San Jose, California
2007 establishments in California